José María Mariano Segundo de Urvina y Viteri (19 March 1808 – 4 September 1891) was President of Ecuador from 13 July 1851 to 16 October 1856. He was born in Quillan San Migelito (Pillaro-Tungurahua) on 19 March 1808.

Name spelling
The correct spelling of his name has been cause of confusion, since his banker son Francisco Urbina Jado wrote it "Urbina" instead of the original "Urvina".

Education and career
José María Urvina pursued his primary education in the village of his birth. He then attended the Navy School in Guayaquil. He was notorious among his classmates from whom he obtained friendship and consideration.

His competence and courage in the naval combat of Punta de Mapelo rose him above other members of the group. He was the aide-camp of Juan José Flores. In his career he demonstrated his vocation, reaching the degree of General of the Republic.

Political life
 Presidents of the Chamber of Deputies in 1849
 Congressman for the province of Guayas
 Governor of Guayaquil
 Chargé d'Affairs of Ecuador in Bogota
 Supreme Chief from 17 July 1851 to 17 July 1852
 Elaboration of the sixth National Constitution. 
 President of Ecuador from 1852 to 1856
 Abolishment of Indian and black slavery in Ecuador, on 25 September 1852.

References
 JOSE MARIA URBINA VITERI. diccionariobiograficoecuador.com
 Official Website of the Ecuadorian Government about the country President's History
 http://www.enciclopediadelecuador.com

1808 births
1891 deaths
People from Píllaro Canton
Ecuadorian people of Basque descent
Presidents of Ecuador
Presidents of the Chamber of Deputies of Ecuador
Members of the National Congress (Ecuador)
Ecuadorian military personnel
19th-century Ecuadorian people